USS Dobler (DE-48) was an Evarts class destroyer escort constructed for the United States Navy during World War II. She was sent off into dangerous North Atlantic Ocean waters to protect convoys and other ships from German submarines and fighter aircraft. She performed escort and antisubmarine operations in battle areas before sailing home victorious at the end of the conflict.

Namesake
Joseph John Julius Dobler was born on 19 November 1918 in Menlo, Washington. He enlisted in the United States Naval Reserve on 14 December 1939 and was appointed aviation cadet 29 January 1940. Lieutenant Dobler was killed in action 30 January 1943 during the Battle of Rennell Island when American aircraft fought off Japanese air attacks on a task force covering the movement of transports to Guadalcanal.

Construction and commissioning
She was launched on 24 July 1942 as BDE-48 by Philadelphia Navy Yard, intended for transfer to Great Britain; retained for use by the United States; and commissioned on 17 May 1943.

Service history

World War II
Dobler voyaged to Port Arthur, Texas, on escort duty from 15 to 28 July 1943, then served as training ship. Reassigned to transatlantic convoy duty, from 27 August 1943 to 14 June 1945, Dobler made 11 voyages from Boston, Norfolk and New York to Bizerte, Tunisia; Oran, Algeria; and Palermo, Sicily. On 11 May 1944, her convoy was attacked off the North African coast by a large number of torpedo and bombing planes which she aided in driving away before they could damage the convoy.

Post-War
From 18 July-10 September 1945, Dobler had training duty at New London, Connecticut. She arrived at New York on 11 September, and was decommissioned there on 2 October 1945. Dobler was sold for scrap on 12 July 1946.

Awards

References

External links

Evarts-class destroyer escorts
World War II frigates and destroyer escorts of the United States
Ships built in Philadelphia
1942 ships